The 2001 season of the Bhutanese A-Division was the seventh recorded season of top-flight football in Bhutan. The league was won by Druk Star, their first title and the first time a Bhutanese team other than Druk Pol had won in the last six years. The league was preceded by a qualifying tournament known as the Thimpu League. Qualifiers from this league joined other teams in a round robin group stage to determine the four teams who would proceed to the knock out stage.

Thimpu League
The 2001 Thimpu League, which started on 15 July, served as a qualifying tournament for the 2001 Bhutan A-Division. 9 teams took part, 5 from Thimpu and 4 from Phuentsholing. It is not known for certain how many teams qualified, but of the four known participants, three qualified as a result of their position.

Known participating teams
From Thimphu:
 Druk Pol
 Druk Stars
 Thimpu

From Paro:
 Paro

Known result

Druk Stars did not qualify for the A-Division.

A-Division
The A-division commenced on 12 August. Although Druk Star had not qualified via the Thimpu League earlier in the year, they were given a place following the withdrawal of Phuentsholing and Chhuka. The league consisted of two groups of three teams playing in a round robin format. The top two teams from each group then qualified for the semi-final knockout stages.

Participating teams

From Thimpu:
 Druk Pol
 Druk Star
 Thimpu

From outside Thimphu:
 Chhukha (withdrew)
 Gomtu
 Paro
 Phuentsholing (withdrew)
 Samtse

Group A

Results

Group B

Results

Semi finals

Third-place match

Final

References

Bhutan A-Division seasons
Bhutan
Bhutan
football